Jayson Patino (born July 30, 1983) is an American Brazilian Jiu Jitsu practitioner who holds a black belt under Ricardo Liborio of American Top Team.  He is known for his competitive achievements in FILA Pankration Submission, ADCC, IBJJF, and other grappling tournaments. He is also owner of American Top Team East Orlando.

Background 
Jayson Patino is a professional martial arts instructor, mixed martial arts fighter, world class grappler, nutrition and strength & conditioning specialist. Patino started training martial arts at age 4. Patino has fought in the World Extreme Fighting Championships, Cage Warriors, and Combat fighting Championship just to name a few. Patino is a black belt in Brazilian Jiu Jitsu under Ricardo Liborio, a member of the US Grappling World Team, FILA Pankration Submission World Champion, and a restricted Black belt in Taekwondo. Patino won the lightweight Pro Division at the 2009 Abu Dhabi Combat Club North American Trials and was one of 16 grapplers worldwide to compete at the ADCC World Championships in Barcelona, Spain. Patino wrestled at the University of Central Florida where he was a 2x All American and earned a degree in Social Science Education.

Mixed martial arts career 
Patino is 3–2 in his mixed martial arts career

Grappling career 
 2014 FILA Pankration Submission World Champion
 3rd place IBJJF No Gi Jiu Jitsu World Championships Black Belt 2014
 2014 US Grappling World Team Trials Champion
 FILA Grappling World Championship No-Gi Bronze Medalist 2013
 FILA Grappling World Championship Gi Bronze Medalist 2013
 2nd place No-Gi Jiu-Jitsu World Championships Brown belt 2012
 3rd place No-Gi Jiu-Jitsu World Championships Purple belt 2009
 Abu Dhabi Combat Club North American Trials Champion 2009
 Abu Dhabi Combat Club Veteran 2009
 US Grappling World Team Trials Gi Champion 2013
 US Grappling World Team Trials No-Gi Champion 2013
 4x Naga No-Gi Expert division Champion 2005-2012
 4x Naga Gi division Champion 2005-2012
 2x Copa America Gi Champion
 2x Copa America No-Gi Expert division Champion
 America's Cup Jiu Jitsu Champion 2005
 2x NCWA Wrestling All American 2004-2005
 2x NCWA Wrestling Conference Champion

References 

1983 births
Living people
American practitioners of Brazilian jiu-jitsu